Camp Quinipet is a Methodist camp, retreat center, and national historic district located at Shelter Island Heights in Suffolk County, New York. It was founded in 1922.  There are 19 buildings that currently make up the camp facility that range in date from about 1830 to 1965. There are 13 contributing buildings, one contributing site, and two contributing structures. The camp is owned and operated by the New York Annual Conference of the United Methodist Church.

It was added to the National Register of Historic Places in 2005.

References

External links
Quinipet Camp and Retreat Center website

Historic districts on the National Register of Historic Places in New York (state)
1922 establishments in New York (state)
Historic districts in Suffolk County, New York
Tourist attractions in Suffolk County, New York
National Register of Historic Places in Suffolk County, New York